Diospyros fasciculosa, is a rainforest tree in the ebony family. Australian common names include grey ebony, clustered persimmon, ebony and Long Tom.

The specific epithet fasciculus refers to a “little bundle”, as the flowers and fruits are in clusters.

Distribution
The tree is native to Australia, Fiji, and Southeast Asia. In Australia it is found from the Clarence River, New South Wales to Bamaga on the Cape York Peninsula.

Description

The clustered fruits are a type of persimmon.

References

fasciculosa
Trees of Australia
Trees of Fiji
Flora of New South Wales
Flora of Queensland
Flora of Java